Kamionek Wielki may refer to the following places in Warmian-Masurian Voivodeship, Poland:

Kamionek Wielki, Elbląg County
Kamionek Wielki, Węgorzewo County

See also
Kamionek (disambiguation)